Lillian Burke (October 4, 1879 – April 13, 1952) was an American artist, teacher, musician and occupational therapist chiefly known for developing a hooked-rug cottage industry in the village of Chéticamp, Cape Breton. From 1927 until 1940, Burke taught the French-speaking women of the village how to create high-quality hooked rugs based on her own designs. Most of the rugs were commissioned by leading New York decorators on behalf of their affluent clients.

Background
Burke worked with the support of Marion Hubbard Bell Fairchild, youngest daughter of Alexander Graham Bell whose wife Mabel had founded Cape Breton Home Industries to train young women in lace-making and fine needlework as a way of earning extra money. After Mabel Bell's death in 1923, Burke and Fairchild re-established the organization to market hooked rugs in an attempt to alleviate the poverty that prevailed in all of Atlantic Canada during the 1920s and 1930s. By one account, the hooked-rug trade brought tens of thousands of dollars into Chéticamp each year during the Great Depression when Cape Breton lumber camps were closed, the gypsum mine was no longer operating and fish sold at ridiculously low prices.

Influenced by William Morris and his Arts and Crafts movement, Burke created hundreds of original rug designs including ones decorated with flowers, birds, animals, trellises and ribbons. The finished rugs were hooked using dyed, home-spun yarn in the soft, muted tones that Morris favoured and that became fashionable among collectors who valued handcrafted textiles over ones that were mass produced. One of Burke's most notable creations was a 648-square-foot rug based on an intricate 17th century French design. It took her three months to block out the pattern for this 1937 Chéticamp Savonnerie carpet on its burlap underlay.

By the mid-1930s, Burke began to face resistance from the Acadian women who were producing ever-larger hooked rugs in factory-like conditions with delayed payments based on the finished product, not the hours spent producing it. Unfounded rumours circulated that Burke was making huge profits while steep increases in U.S. customs tariffs combined with the need to pay postage made the Chéticamp hooked rugs increasingly uncompetitive. To make ends meet, Burke had taken a part-time job in 1930 as an attendant at the State Mental Hospital in Brooklyn. In 1943, she was appointed to a full-time position in the Department of Occupational Therapy at the New York State Psychiatric Institute in Manhattan. Her work there as head of the music therapy program fit well with her earlier experiences as an arts and crafts therapist working with wounded soldiers in Europe and America during and after World War I.

Early life and education

Mary Lillian Burke was born on October 4, 1879 in Washington D.C., the eldest of five children. Her parents, Michael Burke and Mary Wasney, were from working class, immigrant families. Her three-year-old brother died in 1886 and when she was eight, her father succumbed to pulmonary tuberculosis. The following year, a sister died at age two. To support her family, Mary Burke was forced to return to the Government Printing Office where she had worked before her marriage in 1879. Mary's 10-hour days, six days a week, sewing and binding government documents, forced Lillian to act as surrogate mother to her two younger siblings.

Lillian Burke attended Peabody Elementary School in Washington's Stanton Square. However, various records appear to indicate that she likely also attended St. Cecilia's Academy as a part-time student where she would have studied music as well as sewing and painting. In 1893, Burke was admitted to Eastern High School which offered new courses in physical training, home economics and fine art including drawing, painting and sculpture along with other innovations such as learning by doing, problem solving, critical thinking, entrepreneurship and social responsibility.

On her graduation from high school in 1898, Burke won a scholarship allowing her to attend the two-year, teacher training program at Washington Normal School. There she would have taken courses in "child study" or psychology as well as such subjects as music, physical culture, sewing, elocution, penmanship and drawing.

References

1879 births
1952 deaths
Occupational therapists
American textile artists